The German Right Party (DRP) was a far-right political party that emerged in the British zone of Allied-occupied Germany after the Second World War.

Also known as the Deutsche Konservative Partei - Deutsche Rechtspartei (the party used both names, varying the name used between different Länder, but had no direct links to the pre-World War I German Conservative Party), the initially national conservative party was formed in June 1946 by a merger of three smaller groups - the Deutsche Konservative Partei, the Deutsche Aufbaupartei of the Völkisch politician Reinhold Wulle and the Deutsche Bauern- und Landvolk Partei. Its manifesto was in large parts authored by Hans Zehrer.

Originally intended as a continuation of the German National People's Party (DNVP), it soon attracted a number of former Nazis and its programme changed towards a more neo-Nazi stance, while many moderate members left to join the German Party (DP). In the 1949 federal elections to the first Bundestag, the party won five seats, among the deputies was Fritz Rössler (alias Dr. Franz Richter), who soon became notorious for his radical positions.

Despite this success, the DRP was weakened that same year when the Socialist Reich Party (Sozialistische Reichspartei, SRP) was formed and a number of members who supported Otto Ernst Remer and Gerhard Krüger left to join the more openly neo-Nazi party. Indeed, the group lost two of its deputies - Rössler and Fritz Dorls - to this more extreme party upon its foundation. They did however gain one deputy when the Wirtschaftliche Aufbau-Vereinigung, a group of disparate figures who supported the demagogic Munich lawyer Alfred Loritz, disintegrated in the early 1950s. Within the Bundestag, the DRP began to work closely with a number of minor groups on the far-right, such as the National Democrats (a minor group that should not be confused with the later National Democratic Party of Germany). Between 1950 and 1951, the remaining DRP MPs who supported Fritz Rössler sought to merge with these groups in order to form a larger grouping, which resulted in the creation of the Deutsche Reichspartei. Rössler had to vacate his party offices for his contacts with SRP chairmen, he joined the Socialist Reich Party in September 1950.

Although effectively defunct, a report on the party was produced by the Federal Constitutional Court of Germany in the context of the SRP ban in 1952. The report claimed that the party had actively tried to organize members of earlier right wing groups, although no action was taken as the party had ceased to exist. A few members who had not joined the Deutsche Reichspartei continued as "National Rightists" (Nationale Rechte) and finally aligned themselves with the Free Democratic Party in 1954.

See also
Conservatism in Germany

References

1946 establishments in Germany
Political parties established in 1946
Defunct political parties in Germany
Far-right political parties in Germany
Fascist parties in Germany
German nationalist political parties
Political parties disestablished in 1950
National conservative parties